Founded on August 31, 1881, the Deutsche Verein zur Förderung der Luftschifffahrt, (Society for the Promotion of Aeronautics), was the first German aviation association.

Founding 
The motivation for the association arose from the experience of the massive French military balloon units during the Siege of Paris in the Franco-Prussian War of 1870/1871. The association's objects were to promote airship flight by all means, as well as to work on solving the problem of building steerable airships, and especially to support a permanent research station.

Journal 

In 1882 the association started printing , which was the first German technical aviation journal. In 1888 they printed under the title  (Journal of airshipflight) and the Vienese flight association  became co-editors. In 1900 the association adopted the journal  (illustrated aeronautical reports), with the subtitle  (German journal of airshipflight).

Membership and activities
Among the members were: the airship pioneers Paul Haenlein, Friedrich Hermann Wölfert; the meteorologists Richard Aßmann, Arthur Berson and Reinhard Süring; the airship constructor Rudolf Hans Bartsch von Sigsfeld and the flight researcher Otto Lilienthal.

References 

Notes

Bibliography

 Editors of German Wikipedia Verein zur Förderung der Luftschifffahrt – Wikipedia (current version)
 Schulz, Günter O. Luftschiffseiten - Geschichte von Baumgarten & Wölfert. (German) Retrieved 2008-07-20

Aviation pioneers
19th-century German aviation
Aviation history of Germany
Ballooning
Aviation organisations based in Germany
Organizations established in 1881
Aeronautics organizations
1881 establishments in Germany